Triepeolus lunatus is a species of cuckoo bee in the family Apidae. It is found in North America from Canada to northern Mexico. Triepeolus lunatus tends to live in forest edges and meadows.

References

Further reading

External links

 
 

Nomadinae
Articles created by Qbugbot
Insects described in 1824